The 2014 Astana Challenger was a professional tennis tournament played on indoor hard courts. It was the 8th edition  and part of the 2014 ATP Challenger Tour, offering a total of $75,000 in prize money on 17–23 February 2014.

Men's main draw entrants

Seeds

Other entrants 
The following players received wildcards into the singles main draw:
  Kuatbek Abiyev
  Timur Khabibulin
  Karen Khachanov
  Denis Yevseyev

The following players used protected ranking to gain entry into the singles main draw :
  Gilles Müller

The following players received entry from the qualifying draw:
  Aleksandre Metreveli
  Nikoloz Basilashvili
  Victor Baluda
  Alexey Vatutin

Champions

Singles 

  Andrey Golubev def.  Gilles Müller 6–4, 6–4

Doubles 

  Sergey Betov /  Alexander Bury def.  Andrey Golubev /  Evgeny Korolev 6–1, 6–4

External links 
 Official website

2014 Astana Challenger
Astana Challenger
Hard court tennis tournaments
2014 in Kazakhstani sport